The meridian 109° west of Greenwich is a line of longitude that extends from the North Pole across the Arctic Ocean, North America, the Pacific Ocean, the Southern Ocean, and Antarctica to the South Pole.

The 109th meridian west forms a great circle with the 71st meridian east.

From pole to pole
Starting at the North Pole and heading south to the South Pole, the 109th meridian west passes through:

{| class="wikitable plainrowheaders"
! scope="col" width="130" | Co-ordinates
! scope="col" | Country, territory or sea
! scope="col" | Notes
|-valign="top"
| style="background:#b0e0e6;" | 
! scope="row" style="background:#b0e0e6;" | Arctic Ocean
| style="background:#b0e0e6;" | Passing just east of Borden Island, Nunavut, Canada (at ) Passing just east of Vesey Hamilton Island, Nunavut, Canada (at )
|-
| 
! scope="row" | Canada
| Nunavut — Melville Island
|-
| style="background:#b0e0e6;" | 
! scope="row" style="background:#b0e0e6;" | Sabine Bay
| style="background:#b0e0e6;" |
|-
| 
! scope="row" | Canada
|-
| style="background:#b0e0e6;" | 
! scope="row" style="background:#b0e0e6;" | Parry Channel
| style="background:#b0e0e6;" | Viscount Melville Sound
|-
| 
! scope="row" | Canada
| Nunavut — Victoria Island
|-
| style="background:#b0e0e6;" | 
! scope="row" style="background:#b0e0e6;" | Dease Strait
| style="background:#b0e0e6;" |
|-
| style="background:#b0e0e6;" | 
! scope="row" style="background:#b0e0e6;" | Bathurst Inlet
| style="background:#b0e0e6;" |
|-valign="top"
| 
! scope="row" | Canada
|-valign="top"
| 
! scope="row" | United States
| Montana Wyoming — from  Colorado — from  New Mexico — from 
|-valign="top"
| 
! scope="row" | Mexico
|-valign="top"
| style="background:#b0e0e6;" | 
! scope="row" style="background:#b0e0e6;" | Pacific Ocean
| style="background:#b0e0e6;" | Passing just east of Clipperton Island (an overseas possession of France, at ) Passing just east of Easter Island, Chile (at )
|-
| style="background:#b0e0e6;" | 
! scope="row" style="background:#b0e0e6;" | Southern Ocean
| style="background:#b0e0e6;" |
|-
| 
! scope="row" | Antarctica
| Unclaimed territory
|-
|}

See also
108th meridian west
110th meridian west

References

w109 meridian west